Soleils is a 2013 French-Burkinabé road movie about the way in which the history of Africa has been written, especially in relationship to European colonialism.

External links
 

2013 films
Burkinabé drama films